The Hernandez brothers, also known as Los Bros Hernandez, are the three American cartoonist brothers Mario (b. 1953), Gilbert (b. 1957), and Jaime Hernandez (b. 1959).

The three were born in a Mexican-American family and grew up in Oxnard, California.  In the 1980s they gained fame with their comic book Love and Rockets, a prominent series in the early alternative comics scene, and which drew from a wide range of influences, including mainstream and underground comics, punk rock, and Mexican-American culture.  They began publishing the black-and-white series themselves in 1981, and Fantagraphics Books published it from 1982.  The brothers normally worked independently of each other on their own stories.  Gilbert's most significant work features prominent magic realist elements in Central American settings; Jaime's has centred on multicultural Southern California.  Mario's contributions have been infrequent.  The first volume of Love and Rockets after its fiftieth issue in 1996, and while Gilbert and Jaime have taken on a great variety of other projects, they frequently returned to their most familiar characters.

References

Works cited

Further reading

 
 

American cartoonists
American comics artists
American comics writers
Gilbert Hernandez
Jaime Hernandez